Waterfall Branch is a  long 1st order tributary to Lovills Creek in Carroll County, Virginia.

Course 
Waterfall Branch rises at Wards Gap in Carroll County and then flows southeast to join Lovills Creek about 2 miles south-southeast of Wards Gap.

Watershed 
Waterfall Branch drains  of area, receives about 54.8 in/year of precipitation, has a wetness index of 273.71, and is about 67% forested.

See also 
 List of Virginia Rivers

References 

Rivers of Carroll County, Virginia
Rivers of Virginia